Zuni Café is a restaurant in San Francisco, California. It is located on Market Street in San Francisco and named after the Zuni tribe of indigenous Pueblo peoples of Arizona and New Mexico.

Zuni Café was established in 1979 by Billy West. In 1981 he hired Vince Calcagno as the manager, who became a business partner in 1987. West and Calcagno hired Judy Rodgers (formerly of Chez Panisse) as head chef in 1987. West died on July 1, 1994; Calcagno and Rodgers went on to become co-owners.

Zuni Cafe, with Rodgers at the helm, won the James Beard Foundation Award for 'Best Chef: Pacific' in 2000, 'Outstanding Restaurant' in 2003, and 'Outstanding Chef' in 2004. In 2018, the restaurant received the James Beard Award for Outstanding Service.

Calcagno retired in 2006. Gilbert Pilgram joined Zuni Café as a co-owner in 2006. Rodgers died on December 2, 2013.

References

External links 
 Official Zuni Café website
 Open Table.com listing for Zuni Café
 SF Weekly listing for Zuni Café
 "A New Owner for Zuni Cafe" October 6, 2006, Michael Bauer, San Francisco Chronicle

1979 establishments in California
Market Street (San Francisco)
Restaurants in San Francisco
French-American culture in San Francisco
French restaurants in California
Italian-American culture in San Francisco
Italian restaurants in California
Restaurants established in 1979
James Beard Foundation Award winners